Marius Girard (1838-1906) was a French poet. He composed poetry in French and Provençal.

References

1838 births
1906 deaths
People from Saint-Rémy-de-Provence
French poets